Been There, Done That may refer to:

 Been There, Done That (The Riches), season 1 (2007), episode 4, from the TV series The Riches 
 Been There, Done That (Xena episode), season 3 (1997-98), episode 2, from the TV series Xena: Warrior Princess
Been There, Done That (book), 2016 non-fiction book by Al Roker and Deborah Roberts
 "Been There, Done That" (Dr. Dre song)
 "Been There Done That" (NOTD song)
 "Been There, Done That", song by Luke Bryan from the album Tailgates & Tanlines
 "Been There, Done That", song by Emma Bunton from the album A Girl Like Me
 "Been There, Done That", song by Brian Eno and John Cale from the album Wrong Way Up
 "Been There, Done That", song by Memphis May Fire from album Sleepwalking
 Been There, Done That..., album by Eddie and the Hot Rods

See also
"Been There", a song by Clint Black and Steve Wariner